The List of historic monuments protected in 1840 is a list of the historic monuments of France created in 1840 by the French Commission for Historical Monuments (Commission des monuments historiques). It was the first protection of this type in the country.

In 1837, following the request of Prosper Mérimée, then inspector general of historical monuments, the prefects received a circular asking them to draw up a list of the monuments in their department whose restoration they considered to be a priority, by classifying them in order of importance. The Commission for Historical Monuments was then responsible for classifying all the lists: in 1840, this request resulted in a list of a thousand monuments "for which relief has been requested" and therefore require work (and therefore funds), to be preserved. This was the first list of its kind in France.

The monuments concerned are for the most part public (belonging to the State, the municipality, or the department). The list contains both buildings (churches, castles, etc.) and objects (stained-glass windows, etc.). In total, it has 1,082 entries, including 934 buildings.

List of monuments

References

Monuments historiques of France
Heritage registers in France
Historic